The 2020–21 Milwaukee Panthers men's basketball team represented the University of Wisconsin–Milwaukee during the 2020–21 NCAA Division I men's basketball season. The Panthers, led by fourth-year head coach Pat Baldwin, played their home games at the Klotsche Center as members of the Horizon League.

Previous season
The Panthers finished the 2019–20 season 12–19, 7–11 in Horizon League play to finish in a tie for seventh place. They lost in the first round of the Horizon League tournament to Youngstown State.

Roster

Schedule and results 

|-
!colspan=9 style=| Non-conference regular season

|-
!colspan=9 style=| Conference regular season

|-
!colspan=9 style=|Horizon League tournament

Source

References

Milwaukee Panthers men's basketball seasons
Milwaukee
Milwaukee
Milwaukee